Dupleix was the fourth unit of the . She entered service in 1933 and spent the interwar period in the Mediterranean.  She participated in the International Patrol during the Spanish Civil War. September 1939 found her still in Toulon. She participated in the search for the Graf Spee in the Atlantic before returning to Toulon. The only time she fired her guns in anger was during the bombardment of Vado, Italy in mid-June 1940. She was at Toulon at the time of the Franco-German Armistice in June 1940. She remained at Toulon until the French Fleet there was scuttled in late November 1942. She was subsequently raised by the Italians in 1943.

She was named in honour of Joseph François, Marquis Dupleix (1697 - 1763) a French trader in the service of La Compagnie des Indes. He travelled between North America and India. He was appointed Governor-General of French India in 1742. A post he held until his death in 1763.

Design and description
She would have the same protection layout as  however the thickness of the armour would be increased. She would have trainable 5 meter range finders fitted to Turrets II and III. She was to have four quad 13.2 mm machineguns fitted on the bridge structure but it is unclear if they were ever fitted. Her secondary armament was the same as Foch, however these weapons were fitted in twin 1930 mounts rather than 1926 single mounts.

She was to be ordered under the 1928 tranche but due to a bottleneck at the ship yard at Brest she was not ordered until 1 April 1929. Also she was not laid down until 14 November. She was launched on 9 October 1930 and commenced her fitting out. Her construction continued more slowly than her sisters. She commenced her sea trials on 1 October 1931 with her acceptance trials following on 1 December. She was commissioned on 5 May 1932 though not complete until 20 July that year.

Service history

Pre war service 
She entered service on 15 November 1933 being assigned to the First Light Division of the First Squadron at Toulon. On 27 June 1935 she was in attendance of a Naval Review at the Bay of Douranenez. In 1935 the Marine Nationale co-operated with a film company for the production of Veille d'armes, directed by Marcel L'Herbier, a romantic melodrama about a captain in the French Navy. The cruiser Dupleix was made available for location shooting in and around its base in Toulon, and L'Herbier sought to incorporate into the drama as much detail as possible about the ship and its procedures.

During 1937 she underwent a major refit then returned to Toulon.

War service 
On the outbreak of war in September 1939 she was at Toulon with the other five treaty cruisers. On 14 October she was deployed with Algérie to Dakar, Senegal as part of La Marine Nationale's Force X to hunt German surface raiders and merchantmen. The two cruisers were designated Force M by the British based at Dakar. On 25 October with the contre-toppilleurs  and  intercepted and captured the German merchantman Santa Fe. The ships were informed of the engagement off the River Plate when they were 850 nm from Pernambuco. They returned to Dakar to refuel so they could better place themselves if  escaped to the sea. Force X again sortied from Dakar on 30 December, returning on 5 January 1940. She departed Dakar for the last time on 23 January with the cruiser Foch to escort a convoy from Bermuda to Morocco. Both ships then returned to Toulon.

On the night of 13/14 June she participated in Operation Vado, the bombardment of Genoa and Vado, Italy by the Third Squadron. The Vado Group included the cruisers Foch and Algérie and the Genoa Group included the cruisers Dupleix and Colbert. The bombardment cause little damage as Group Genoa fired at the wrong target and half of Group Vado shells fell into the sea. The squadron returned to Toulon by mid-day on 14 June. Foch suffered a steering malfunction but returned safely. On 25 June the Franco-German Armistice took effect and La Marine National ceased all offensive operations. With continued British action around Dakar, the Vichy French had scheduled for 22 September 1940 to send the cruisers Algérie, Foch, Dupleix,  and  plus three contre torpilleurs and two fleet torpedo boats to Dakar as reinforcements. The plan was vetoed by the Germans on 20 September.

On 1 January 1941 Dupleix was reduced to care and maintenance being replaced by Colbert in the First Cruiser Division. She was reactivated on 4 October replacing Foch. Following the Torch landings in North Africa, the Germans invaded the unoccupied zone of France on 11 November 1942. The FHM was ready to sail to North Africa to defend it from the Torch landings but was denied permission to sail. By 27 November the Germans had reached Toulon and entered the base. The Germans were delayed from entering the naval dockyard giving the French sailors time to scuttle the fleet. Dupleix was tied up in the Missiessy Basin.  The Germans boarded the ship and forced the crew below to close the sea cocks and condensers before the ship sank. The guns had been destroyed by explosive charges and a fire took hold in the ship. The fire was punctuated by numerous explosions. Dupleix burned until 6 December. Dupleix was refloated on 3 July 1943 by the Italians. In March 1944 she was hit by bombs during an American air attack and she was sunk again. She was scrapped in situ in 1951.

References

Bibliography

External links 

 203 mm/50 (8in) Model 1924 naval gun
 90 mm/50 (3.5 in) Model 1926 naval gun
 37 mm/50 (1.46 in) Model 1933 naval gun
 13.2 mm(0.5 in) machinegun Model 1929
 French Pre-war Torpedoes
 Dupleix on Uboat.net

 

World War II warships scuttled at Toulon
1930 ships
World War II cruisers of France